Mark Howard Francis Beach (born 1962) is a priest of the Church of England.  He was the Dean of Rochester Cathedral from 2012 to January 2015  when he became the director of Blackfriars Settlement.

Early life and education
Beach grew up in Staffordshire.  He studied theology at the University of Kent for his BA degree in 1980 and completed an MA degree in mission and ministry studies at the University of Nottingham in 1995.  At King's College London he completed a University of London doctorate in ministry (DMin) in 2011. Beach came out to his father as gay when he was 17 but was told "no son of mine is gay" so he went on to marry a woman.

Ordained ministry
Beach trained for ordained ministry at St Stephen's House from 1985 to 1987.  His curacy was at Hucknall Torkard in the Diocese of Southwell and Nottingham.  He then moved to the parish of Gedling, a few miles away in the same diocese, as rector from 1993 to 2001.  He was the bishop's chaplain in the Diocese of Wakefield from 2001 to 2003 before going to Rugby, Warwickshire, as a team rector.  He left Rugby in 2012 to take up the appointment of Dean of Rochester.  In January 2015 it was announced that he had resigned from this position because of issues regarding his marriage break-up.

Post resignation
In late January the Bishop of Rochester announced that "Beach is taking on a new role outside ordained ministry, and has been appointed to the post of director of the Blackfriars Settlement." In October 2018, he appeared on the Channel 4 programme First Dates Hotel. He revealed on the show that his marriage broke down after he came out to his wife and daughter.

Styles
Mr Mark Beach (until 1987)
The Revd Mark Beach (1987–2012; 2015–present)
The Very Revd Mark Beach (2012–2015)

Notes

References

External links
 Official website of Rochester Cathedral
 Kent Messenger's announcement

1962 births
Living people
Alumni of the University of Kent
Alumni of the University of Nottingham
Alumni of King's College London
Deans of Rochester
20th-century English Anglican priests
21st-century English Anglican priests
English gay men
LGBT Anglican clergy
20th-century English LGBT people
21st-century English LGBT people